David Miscavige (born April 30, 1960) is the leader of the Church of Scientology. His official title within the organization is Chairman of the Board of the Religious Technology Center (RTC), a corporation that controls the trademarks and copyrights of Dianetics and Scientology. He is also referred to within the Scientology organization as "Captain of the Sea Org".

Miscavige was a deputy to Scientology founder L. Ron Hubbard as a teenager. He joined the Sea Org, a management group for the Scientology organization, then later joined the Commodore's Messenger Organization, a group within the Sea Org that carried Hubbard's orders to subordinates. He rose to a leadership position by the early 1980s and was named "Chairman of the Board" of RTC in 1987, the year after Hubbard's death. Official Church of Scientology biographies describe Miscavige as "the ecclesiastical leader of the Scientology religion".

Since he assumed his leadership position, there have been a number of allegations made against Miscavige. These include claims of human trafficking, child abuse, slavery, forced separation of family members, coercive fundraising practices, harassment of journalists and Church of Scientology critics, and emotional and physical abuse of subordinates by Miscavige. Miscavige and spokespersons for the organization deny the majority of these claims, often making derogatory comments and attacking the credibility of those who bring them.

Miscavige has been investigated by the Federal Bureau of Investigation due to allegations of criminal activities within the Scientology organization. He is named as a defendant in numerous lawsuits involving his role in the organization. The most recent lawsuit, filed in April 2022, refers to repeated sexual assault of children by senior Scientology officials in the Sea Org during Miscavige's leadership. The case also involves allegations of human trafficking, forced labor, and other forms of child abuse.

Early life 
David Miscavige was born in 1960 in Bristol Township, Bucks County, Pennsylvania, to the Roman Catholic Polish-Italian family of Ronald and Loretta Miscavige. Miscavige and his twin sister, Denise, were raised primarily in Willingboro Township, New Jersey.

As a child, Miscavige played baseball and football, but he suffered from asthma and severe allergies. His father, a trumpet player, became interested in Scientology, and he sent the younger Miscavige to see a Scientologist. According to both father and son, a 45-minute Dianetics session cured his ailments.

Miscavige's family joined the Church of Scientology in 1971 and eventually moved to the organization's world headquarters in Saint Hill Manor, England. By the age of twelve, Miscavige was conducting Scientology auditing sessions. Saint Hill served as his own training ground as an auditor, and he is remembered by the organization as the "12-year-old prodigy" who became the youngest professional Scientology auditor. The family returned to Philadelphia within a few years, where Miscavige attended Marple Newtown High School.

In 1976, on his sixteenth birthday, Miscavige left high school with his father's permission to move to Clearwater, Florida, and joined the Sea Org, a Scientologist organization established in 1968 by founder L. Ron Hubbard. Some of his earliest jobs in the Sea Org included delivering telexes, groundskeeping, food service and taking photographs for Scientology brochures. Miscavige then joined an elite group of young Scientologists in the Sea Org called the Commodore's Messenger Organization (CMO), which Hubbard had established to carry out his personal errands and deliver executive directives to Scientology management, but as they grew into adolescence, their power and influence within the Sea Org increased.

Early roles in Scientology

By 1977, Miscavige was living in La Quinta, California, and working directly under Hubbard as a cameraman for Scientology training films. Hubbard appointed Miscavige to the CMO, responsible for enforcing Hubbard's policies within the individual Scientology organizations; Miscavige became head of the CMO in 1979. By 1980, Hubbard was no longer appearing at public functions related to Scientology, and by some accounts Miscavige took effective control of the organization at this time. In 1981, Miscavige was placed in charge of the Watchdog Committee and the All Clear Unit, with the task of handling the various legal claims against Hubbard. He also became in charge of Author Services, Inc., an entity to manage Hubbard's literary and financial affairs, which was established in the same year.

Sea Org succession
By age of 19, Miscavige headed the Commodore's Messenger Organization, responsible for sending out teams to investigate problem areas within the Scientology organization. In 1987, the year after Hubbard's death, he became the Captain of the Sea Org, which gave him absolute authority over the Sea Org command structure and all Sea Org orgs.

Operation Snow White
After the Guardian's Office's (GO) criminal involvement in Operation Snow White, Miscavige persuaded Mary Sue Hubbard to resign from the GO and purged several top GO officials through ethics proceedings. The St. Petersburg Times, in a 1998 article "The Man Behind Scientology", says: "During two heated encounters, Miscavige persuaded Mary Sue Hubbard to resign. Together they composed a letter to Scientologists confirming her decision – all without ever talking to L. Ron Hubbard." She subsequently changed her mind, believing that she had been tricked. Despite this, Miscavige claims he and Mary Sue Hubbard remained friends thereafter.

Corporate restructuring
In 1982, Miscavige set up a new organizational structure to release Hubbard from personal liability and to handle the Scientology founder's personal wealth through a corporate entity outside of the Scientology organization. He established the Religious Technology Center (RTC), in charge of licensing Scientology's intellectual property, and Author Services Inc. to manage the proceeds. Miscavige has held the title of chairman of the board of the RTC since the organization's founding. The Church of Spiritual Technology (CST) was created at the same time with an option to repurchase all of RTC's intellectual property rights. In a 1982 probate case, Ronald DeWolf, Hubbard's estranged son, accused Miscavige of embezzling from and manipulating his father. Hubbard denied this in a written statement, saying that his business affairs were being well managed by Author Services Inc., of which Miscavige was also chairman of the board. In the same document, Hubbard called Miscavige a "trusted associate" and "good friend" who had kept his affairs in good order. A judge ruled the statement was authentic. The case was dismissed on June 27, 1983.

In October 1982, Miscavige required Scientology Missions to enter new trademark usage contracts which established stricter policies on the use of Scientology materials. Over the two years following the formation of the RTC, Miscavige and his team replaced most of Scientology's upper and middle management. A number of those ousted attempted to establish breakaway organizations, such as the Advanced Ability Center led by David Mayo, a former RTC board member who had also been Hubbard's personal auditor. The Advanced Ability Center closed in 1984, two years after opening.

1986–2009: Leadership of Scientology organization
When Hubbard died in 1986, Miscavige announced Hubbard's death to Scientologists at the Hollywood Palladium. Shortly before Hubbard died, an apparent order from him circulated in the Sea Org that promoted Scientologist Pat Broeker and his wife to the new rank of Loyal Officer, making them the highest-ranking members; Miscavige asserted this order had been forged. After Hubbard's death, Miscavige assumed the position of head of the Church of Scientology and, according to the organization, "ecclesiastical leader of the Scientology religion". Within the Scientology organization Miscavige is given the title of "Captain of the Sea Organization", and is its highest-ranking member.

Since Miscavige assumed his leadership role in Scientology, there have been numerous accounts of illegal and unethical practices by the Church of Scientology and by Miscavige himself. A 1991 Time magazine cover story, "The Thriving Cult of Greed and Power", described Miscavige as "ringleader" of a "hugely profitable global racket that survives by intimidating members and critics in a Mafia-like manner". Miscavige stated in a 1992 interview on Nightlinehis only live televised interview to datethat the publication of the article resulted from a request by Eli Lilly, because of "the damage we had caused to their killer drug Prozac". The Scientology organization filed a suit against Lilly, J. Walter Thompson, Hill & Knowlton and the WPP Group. Scientology agreed to settle the case shortly before it went to trial. The Scientology organization also brought a libel lawsuit against the piece's publisher Time Warner and its author Richard Behar, seeking damages of $416 million. All counts of the suit were dismissed by the court, and the dismissal upheld when the Scientology organization appealed. Similar lawsuits in Switzerland, France, Italy, the Netherlands, and Germany were dismissed as groundless.

In 1987, the BBC Panorama program Scientology: The Road to Total Freedom? featured an interview with former member Don Larson, who described Miscavige's physical violence towards a staff member. In a 1995 interview for ITV, Stacy Young, Miscavige's former secretary and the ex-wife of Hubbard's former spokesman, Robert Vaughn Young, asserted that Miscavige emotionally tormented staff members on a regular basis. "His viciousness and his cruelty to staff was unlike anything that I had ever experienced in my life", she said. "He just loved to degrade the staff."

Though Miscavige and Scientology have been the subject of much press attention, he has rarely spoken directly to the press. Exceptions include the 1992 interview on Nightline, a 1998 newspaper interview with the St. Petersburg Times, and a 1998 appearance in an A&E Investigative Reports installment called "Inside Scientology".

Relationship with the IRS 

In 1991, Miscavige, together with Marty Rathbun, visited the Internal Revenue Service (IRS) headquarters in Washington, D.C. to arrange a meeting with Commissioner Fred T. Goldberg, Jr. For more than two decades, the IRS had refused to recognize Scientology as a nonprofit charitable organization. Prior to this meeting, Scientology had filed more than fifty lawsuits against the IRS and, according to The New York Times:

At the meeting with Commissioner Goldberg, Miscavige offered to cease Scientology's suits against the IRS in exchange for tax exemptions. This led to a two-year negotiating process, in which IRS tax analysts were ordered to ignore the substantive issues because the issues had been resolved prior to review. In 1992 Scientology was granted recognition as a nonprofit organization in the U.S., which creates a tax exemption for the Church of Scientology International and its subsidiaries, and tax deductions for those who contribute to their programs. Senior Scientology officials and the IRS later issued a statement that the ruling was based on a two-year inquiry and voluminous documents that, they said, showed the organization was qualified for the exemptions.

To announce the settlement with the IRS, Miscavige gathered a reported 10,000 members of Scientology in the Los Angeles Memorial Sports Arena, where he delivered a two-and-a-half-hour address and proclaimed, "The war is over!" The crowd gave Miscavige an ovation that lasted more than ten minutes.

Church of Scientology initiatives

According to the Scientology organization, Miscavige initiated a long-term project of issuing unreleased and corrected editions of Hubbard's books and restoring L. Ron Hubbard lectures, including translating many works into other languages. Another initiative by Miscavige, launched in 2003, is to build new or remodeled Scientology locations, called "Ideal Orgs", in every major city in the world. Since then, over seventy new or remodelled locations have been opened, including facilities in Washington, D.C., Madrid, New York City, London, Berlin, Mexico City, Rome, Tel Aviv, Atlanta, Miami, and San Diego.

As Chairman of the Board of the RTC, Miscavige works primarily from Scientology's Gold Base near Hemet, California. Scientologists often refer to him as "DM", or "C.O.B.", for chairman of the board. In their 2007 book, Extraordinary Groups: An Examination of Unconventional Lifestyles, W. W. Zellner and Richard T. Schaefer noted that, "David Miscavige has been the driving force behind the Church of Scientology for the past two decades" and that, "Miscavige's biography and speeches are second only to Hubbard in dominating the official Scientology Web site."

Flag Building

One of the largest projects of Miscavige's career is the Flag Building, originally called the "Super Power Building", which is described as the spiritual headquarters of the Scientology organization. It is the largest of Scientology's properties in Clearwater, Florida. The 377,000 square foot structure is reportedly outfitted with custom-built equipment designed to administer the supposedly perception-enhancing "Super Power Rundown" to high-level Scientologists. The building was scheduled for completion in 2003, but underwent ten years of delays and re-designs as Scientology completed two other major construction and restoration projects in the same area ahead of it, the Fort Harrison Hotel and the Oak Cove Hotel. Miscavige inaugurated the Flag Building on November 17, 2013.

2009–present: criminal investigation and lawsuits

In 2009, the St. Petersburg Times published a series titled "The Truth Rundown", which featured allegations by former high-ranking executives of Scientology that Miscavige had repeatedly humiliated and physically beaten his staff, and had confined Church of Scientology staff members in degrading conditions in a property owned by the organization known as "The Hole". The series included interviews with Mike Rinder, former official spokesperson for the Church of Scientology and director of the organizations's Office of Special Affairs, and Mark Rathbun, the former Inspector General of the RTC. Rinder has said that he was physically assaulted by Miscavige on about fifty occasions. These allegations have been supported by other former Scientologists. Lawrence Wright, author of Going Clear: Scientology, Hollywood, and the Prison of Belief, interviewed twelve individuals who reported having been personally attacked by Miscavige and twenty-one people who say they have witnessed such attacks. Scientology denies all of these reports.

"Inside Scientology: The Truth Rundown" was recognized with journalistic honors, including the 2010 Gold Medal for Public Service award from the Florida Society of News Editors. The series was cited as a basis for subsequent journalistic investigations, including a weeklong series hosted on CNN by Anderson Cooper. In an incident also witnessed and supported by Amy Scobee, Jeff Hawkins, a former marketing guru for Scientology, said he had attended a meeting where Miscavige "jumped up on the conference room table, like with his feet right on the conference room table, launched himself across the table at me – I was standing – battered my face, and then shoved me down on the floor".

Scientology representatives have consistently denied abuse by Miscavige, insisting that the allegations come from apostates motivated by bitterness or attempting to extract money from the organization. Hawkins' claims were responded to by Scientology when he reiterated them in a documentary, saying they were "fabricated" and referring to him as "a discredited anti-Scientology media source". Scientology executive David Bloomberg said that it was Hawkins who attacked Miscavige. Miscavige sent an open letter to the newspaper challenging the integrity of the reporters and labeling their sources as "lying", after the persons in question had been removed from the Scientology organization for what Miscavige described as "fundamental crimes against the Scientology religion". Scientology also commissioned an independent review of the Timess reporting, but have not, to date, released those findings.

Miscavige is portrayed within Scientology as "a servant of Hubbard's message, not an agent in his own right". Official Scientology websites describe him as Hubbard's "trusted friend". Miscavige uses Church publications as well as professionally produced videos of gala events, at which he acts as master of ceremonies, to communicate with Scientologists worldwide. According to the organization, as the RTC's chairman of the board his primary task is to "preserve, maintain and protect" the Scientology organization.

In 2012, Miscavige opened Scientology's "National Affairs Office" in Washington, D.C., which he declared to be, "An office designed to give back to a United States government that steadfastly guaranteed our religious rights, the very freedom that allows us to do what we are doing today." Scientology says the National Affairs Office was built "to oversee programs around the country and the world dealing with human rights, drug addiction, literacy and disaster response".

FBI investigation
In his role as the leader of Scientology, Miscavige has been the subject of law enforcement investigations, including by the Federal Bureau of Investigation, into suspected human trafficking, and slavery. He is also the subject of ongoing lawsuits involving child abuse, human trafficking, and forced labor. He was investigated as part of wide-ranging investigation into Scientology by the FBI in 2009–2010. It focused particularly on criminal activities at the organization's de facto headquarters near San Jacinto, California, against which the FBI had planned a raid before the investigation was discontinued.

Scientology Network
Scientology launched the Scientology Network, a DIRECTV broadcast and OTT streaming service on March 12, 2018, with Miscavige introducing its inaugural broadcast in a rare on-camera appearance. The network is produced by Scientology Media Productions in Los Angeles, a facility opened by the organization in May 2016. Addressing the crowd at the SMP opening, Miscavige called the channel, "Our uncorrupted communication line to the billions. Because as the saying goes, if you don't write your own story, someone else will."

Abuse lawsuits
An individual who was raised as a Scientologist and joined the Sea Org had been assigned as Miscavige's personal steward at the age of fifteen. She filed suit against the Scientology organization and Miscavige in 2019. The lawsuit also alleged kidnapping, stalking, libel, slander, constructive invasion of privacy and intentional infliction of emotional distress. Lawyers for the Scientology organization convinced a judge to move the case to internal Scientology arbitration in January 2020.

Miscavige is named in a lawsuit involving a series of alleged rapes by Danny Masterson, and subsequent efforts by the Scientology organization to harass the three women accusing Masterson. The organization's lawyers had tried to force the case into the organization's own arbitration, similar to the case in 2020, but this failed following a three-judge ruling in January 2022.

Three former Scientology workers filed a lawsuit for human trafficking, and peonage of children as young as six years old, against Miscavige and the organization in April 2022. The lawsuit also alleges repeated sexual assault of children by senior members of the Sea Org, of which Miscavige was leader at the time and remains so to the present. The court overseeing the case was told by counsel for the plaintiffs that Miscavige was evading service in the case over a period of months, with at least fourteen attempts being made to serve the summons. The evasion included Miscavige ordering the security team at his house to prevent the summons from being delivered. The court found the allegations sufficiently credible that it ordered that Miscavige be served through the office of the Secretary of State of Florida.

Personal life

Marriage
Miscavige is married to fellow Sea Org member Michele Diane "Shelly" Miscavige, who has not been seen in public since August 2007. Multiple sources have alleged she disappeared from Gold Base shortly after she "filled several job vacancies without her husband's permission". In July 2012, responding to press accounts of speculation on Shelly's whereabouts, lawyers who said they represented her informed two UK newspapers that "she is not missing and devotes her time to the work of the Church of Scientology". In 2013, in the Los Angeles Times, Andrew Blankstein reported, based on anonymous sources from the Los Angeles Police Department (LAPD), that the department had closed their investigation following a missing-persons report filed by former Scientologist and actress Leah Remini, having "located and spoke[n]" to Shelly Miscavige. The LAPD declined to answer questions about the details of the report. Lawrence Wright reports that "former Sea Org members" say Shelly is being held under guard at Gold Base.

Family and relatives
Miscavige's elder brother Ronald Miscavige Jr. served as an executive in the Sea Org for a time, but left Scientology in 2000. Miscavige's twin sister, Denise Licciardi, was hired by major Scientology donor Bryan Zwan as a top executive for the Clearwater, Florida-based company Digital Lightwave, where she was linked to an accounting scandal. Ronald Jr.'s daughter Jenna Miscavige Hill, niece of David Miscavige, remained in the Sea Org until 2005. She has since become an outspoken critic of Scientology, publishing a book about her experiences in 2013. In the book, titled Beyond Belief: My Secret Life Inside Scientology And My Harrowing Escape, she stated that her grandfather Ronald Miscavige Sr. left the Church of Scientology in 2012 and is living with her father in Virginia.

In July 2013, Wisconsin police confronted Dwayne S. Powell after a suspicious person report. Powell said he had been hired at $10,000 a week to conduct full-time surveillance on the elder Miscavige for Scientology, which he said he had been doing for over a year. Los Angeles Times reporter Kim Christensen reports that David Miscavige and Scientology denied any connection to Powell. Gary Soter, a Church attorney, stated that the allegations were "blatantly false". Powell told police that on one occasion, he witnessed what he believed to be Ronald Sr. undergoing cardiac arrest. According to Powell, after immediately reporting the perceived emergency to his superiors, he received a call for further instructions from a man who identified himself as David Miscavige. According to the police report, Powell was instructed not to intervene in any way. Church of Scientology spokesperson Karin Pouw asserted in an email that "no such conversation with Mr. Miscavige ever took place." Ron Miscavige and Dan Koon wrote Ruthless: Scientology, My Son David Miscavige, and Me, which was published in May 2016.

Friendship with Tom Cruise
Miscavige is a close friend to actor Tom Cruise and served as best man at Cruise's wedding to Katie Holmes.

See also 

 Church of Spiritual Technology
 List of Scientology officials
 My Scientology Movie
 Ruthless: Scientology, My Son David Miscavige, and Me

References

Works cited

External links 

 
 Official biography of David Miscavige from the Religious Technology Center

Interviews and press coverage
 "Interview with Scientology Leader", a 1992 televised interview with David Miscavige in Nightline
 "The Man Behind Scientology", a 1998 interview with David Miscavige in the St. Petersburg Times
 "The Truth Rundown", investigative reports and interviews about Scientology, largely focused on Miscavige, St. Petersburg Times, June–August 2009
 Episode #947 of The Joe Rogan Experience: An interview with David Miscavige's father.

1960 births
Living people
American people of Italian descent
American people of Polish descent
American Scientologists
Converts to Scientology from Roman Catholicism
People from Hemet, California
People from Willingboro Township, New Jersey
Scientology officials
American twins
Cult leaders